Professor Amin Saikal  (born in Kabul, Afghanistan), is Adjunct Professor of Social Sciences at the University of Western Australia, and a former University Distinguished Professor and Director of the Centre for Arab and Islamic Studies (The Middle East & Central Asia), and Public Policy Fellow at the Australian National University. Professor Saikal has specialised in the politics, history, political economy and international relations of the Middle East and Central Asia. He has been a Visiting Fellow at Princeton University, Cambridge University and the Institute of Development Studies (University of Sussex), as well as a Rockefeller Foundation Fellow in International Relations (1983-1988). He is a member of many national and international academic organisations.

Professor Amin Saikal is a frequent commentator on radio and television. , and has published numerous articles in international journals, as well as many feature articles in major international newspapers, including the International Herald Tribune, The New York Times and The Guardian.

Honours and recognition
 Elected Member of the Order of Australia (AM) in the 2006 Australia Day Honours for "service to the international community and to education through the development of the Centre for Arab and Islamic studies, and as an author and adviser".
 In 2013 elected Fellow of the Academy of the Social Sciences in Australia.

Writings

 Saikal, Amin, editor (2016). Weak States, Strong Societies: Power and Authority in the New World Order. I. B. Tauris. .
 Saikal, Amin (2016). Iran at the Crossroads. Polity Press. .
 Saikal, Amin (2019).  Iran Rising: The Survival and Future of the Islamic Republic. Princeton University Press. .

 Piscatori, James, and Saikal, Amin (2019). Islam beyond Borders: The Umma in World Politics. Cambridge University Press. .

References

External links
 http://cais.anu.edu.au/
East Asia Forum

Afghan expatriates in Australia
Academic staff of the Australian National University
1950 births
Princeton University fellows
Living people
Australian Muslims
Members of the Order of Australia
Fellows of the Academy of the Social Sciences in Australia